The third and final season of Shake It Up premiered on Disney Channel on October 14, 2012. Kenton Duty is not a main cast member in this season and has been removed from the opening credits. This is the final season of the series, with the series finale airing on November 10, 2013.

Production and release
On June 4, 2012, the series was renewed for its third season. Filming for the season began in July 2012 and ended in March 2013. It was announced that Kenton Duty would be removed from the main cast and would not appear in the opening credits. In September 2012, the season was announced to premiere in October. The third season officially premiered on October 14, 2012 and aired its last episode on November 10, 2013 with 26 episodes aired for the season. Rob Lotterstein returned as executive producer and showrunner. Jeff Strauss didn't return and was replaced by Eileen Conn, while Season 2 writer Darin Henry filled Conn's position as co-executive producer. Consulting producer, David Holden, was succeeded by Melissa & Joey writer Jennifer Glickman.

Synopsis
In the season premiere, Shake It Up, Chicago is on hiatus due to the stage being burned down. Everyone tries to investigate the problem of how the stage got burnt. Plus, Tinka tries to be nice to Rocky and CeCe after Gunther moves to the old country. At the end, she, Rocky, and CeCe become friends. The problem is finally solved when one of the firemen says that a tanning bed was the reason why the stage got burnt and Gary ends up being the perpetrator because he forgot to turn it off when they went to Japan. CeCe and Rocky try to find other things to do since they can't perform on the show for a while, but they begin to fall into a "funk stage." In the episode "Quit It Up," the stage has finally re-opened, but everyone has to re-audition for the show. In the episode "Ty It Up," Gary has been replaced with a new producer, Phil, who makes everyone re-audition. Ty tries to become a dancer on the show which affects Rocky. Phil will only let one of them be on the show which causes a feud between the two of them. Ty unexpectedly becomes the new host of the show, but Rocky still doesn't get the gig. In the episode "Forward and Back It Up," Rocky saves Phil's life when he chokes on a meatball. He then gives her the job back on the show, but Rocky wants to earn it by re-auditioning. She finally decides to take her job back and is now back on the show. Georgia starts dating firefighter Jeremy Hunter, and they subsequently get engaged and plan a wedding. Jeremy has a son, Logan (Leo Howard) who clashes with CeCe, but becomes a love interest of Rocky. At the Jones/Hunter wedding, Georgia and Jeremy break up at the altar and Rocky and Logan start dating. The couple break up a few episodes later after Logan won't make an effort to befriend CeCe.

Opening sequence
Selena Gomez sings the theme song. The opening theme starts with Rocky and CeCe dancing in grass skirts (as shown in "Boot It Up"), then showing various clips of the cast members (some clips from the previous seasons are also included), starting off with Zendaya and Bella Thorne, then going in order with Davis Cleveland, Roshon Fegan, Adam Irigoyen, and Caroline Sunshine. Kenton Duty is not a main cast member in this season, so he is not included in the credits. It then shows more various clips of the cast members as it gives credit to the creator of the series, Chris Thompson. A final clip shows the same thing that was shown in the previous seasons, but Rocky and CeCe are wearing different outfits. The theme song is also shortened only in this season.

Music

The third soundtrack "Shake It Up: I Love Dance" was released on March 5, 2013. "This Is My Dance Floor" was released as a promotional single on February 12, 2013. "Contagious Love" was released on February 19, 2013 as the first single from the soundtrack with an accompanying music video released on March 1, 2013 during an episode of Jessie.

Episodes

 Kenton Duty is no longer a main cast member and is removed from the opening credits.
 Buddy Handleson is no longer appearing on the show as a recurring character. He was also dismissed from the show after the second season finale along with Kenton Duty.
 This season filmed from July 2012 to March 2013.
 This season started during 2012's Monstober along with Make Your Mark.
 This season played the shortened version of the theme song.

References

3
2012 American television seasons
2013 American television seasons